The Fairweather Range is the unofficial name for a mountain range located in the U.S. state of Alaska and the Canadian province of British Columbia. It is the southernmost range of the Saint Elias Mountains. The northernmost section of the range is situated in Tatshenshini-Alsek Provincial Park while the southernmost section resides in Glacier Bay National Park, in the Hoonah-Angoon Census Area. In between it goes through the southeastern corner of Yakutat Borough.
Peaks of this range include Mount Fairweather (the highest point in British Columbia) and Mount Quincy Adams .

The range is home to the Fairweather Fault, an active geologic transform fault of the larger Queen Charlotte Fault along the boundary between the Pacific and North American plates.

Mountains
Mount Crillon
Mount Fairweather
Mount La Perouse
Mount Orville
Mount Quincy Adams
Mount Wilbur

Panorama

See also
Alsek Ranges - mountain range to the east
Centennial Range - mountain range to the northwest

References

 

Landforms of Hoonah–Angoon Census Area, Alaska
Mountains of Unorganized Borough, Alaska
Mountains of Yakutat City and Borough, Alaska
+
Mountain ranges of Alaska